Morannes is a former commune in the Maine-et-Loire department in western France. On 1 January 2016, it was merged into the new commune of Morannes-sur-Sarthe, which became part of Morannes sur Sarthe-Daumeray in January 2017.

See also
Communes of the Maine-et-Loire department

References

Former communes of Maine-et-Loire